The 8th Secretariat of the Workers' Party of Korea (WPK) (8차 조선로동당 비서국), officially the Secretariat of the 8th Central Committee of the Workers' Party of Korea, was elected by the 1st Plenary Session of the 8th Central Committee in the immediate aftermath of the 8th WPK Congress.

Officers

Members elected at the 1st Plenary Session

Changes

References

8th Secretariat of the Workers' Party of Korea